The 2009–10 Cypriot Third Division was the 39th season of the Cypriot third-level football league. Chalkanoras Idaliou won their 2nd title.

Format
Fourteen teams participated in the 2009–10 Cypriot Third Division. All teams played against each other twice, once at their home and once away. The team with the most points at the end of the season crowned champions. The first three teams were promoted to the 2010–11 Cypriot Second Division and the last three teams were relegated to the 2010–11 Cypriot Fourth Division.

Point system
Teams received three points for a win, one point for a draw and zero points for a loss.

Changes from previous season
Teams promoted to 2009–10 Cypriot Second Division
 Akritas Chlorakas
 Frenaros FC
 Othellos Athienou

Teams relegated from 2008–09 Cypriot Second Division
 Chalkanoras Idaliou
 THOI Lakatamia
 Ethnikos Assia

Teams promoted from 2008–09 Cypriot Fourth Division
 Achyronas Liopetriou
 ENAD Polis Chrysochous
 Iraklis Gerolakkou

Teams relegated to 2009–10 Cypriot Fourth Division
 Anagennisi Trachoniou
 Orfeas Nicosia
 Olympos Xylofagou

Stadia and locations

League standings

Results

See also
 Cypriot Third Division
 2009–10 Cypriot First Division
 2009–10 Cypriot Cup for lower divisions

Sources

Cypriot Third Division seasons
Cyprus
2009–10 in Cypriot football